Kitty and the Bagman is a 1983 Australian film about gangsters in the 1920s. It was based on the rivalry of Kate Leigh and Tilly Devine.

Premise
Kitty O'Rourke arrives in Australia from England as a war bride. Her husband is arrested by a Sydney policeman known as the bagman. This leads Kitty to a life of crime and a rivalry with another female criminal.

Cast
Liddy Clark as Kitty O'Rourke
John Stanton as The Bagman
Val Lehman as "Big" Lil Delaney
Gerard Maguire
Colette Mann
Paul Chubb
Danny Adcock
David Bradshaw
Anthony Hawkins
John Ewart as The Train Driver

Several of the cast had been in the TV series Prisoner.

Production
Most of the film was shot on sets at the Mort Bay studios in Balmain, New South Wales. Filming started November 1981. The set was auctioned off afterwards.

During filming a visit was paid to the set by then-treasurer John Howard and then-Prime Minister Malcolm Fraser. The film was completed in 1982 but its release was held back a year.

Director Donald Crombie looked back on the film with mixed emotion:
That probably shouldn't have been made. It was a bit of an aberration. That only got made because we were flush with funds. That was when it became ridiculously easy to make films... There were better things we should have been doing with our time.

Reception
Reviews were mixed.

Home media

Kitty and the Bagman was released on DVD by Umbrella Entertainment in October 2011. The DVD is compatible with all region codes.

References

External links

Kitty and the Bagman at Oz Movies

1983 films
1980s crime films
Australian crime films
Films set in the 1920s
Films directed by Donald Crombie
Films scored by Brian May (composer)
1980s English-language films
1980s Australian films